John Wright (February 2, 1811 – April 11, 1846) was an American physician and botanist.

Wright was Amos Eaton's student and co-authored the last, eighth, edition of the Manual of Botany. He had one son, with Mary Cottrell, who died on September 18, 1841. In 1833, he graduated with a medical degree from Yale College. He went on to be a professor at the Rensselaer Polytechnic Institute and a lecturer for the Rensselaer County Medical Society. For two years he associated in practice with Thomas C. Brinsmade.

References

American botanists
Botanists with author abbreviations
Rensselaer Polytechnic Institute faculty
Yale School of Medicine alumni
People from Troy, New York
1811 births
1846 deaths
Scientists from New York (state)